Herbert Mühlenberg (born 23 April 1949) is a German former professional football player and manager, who played as a forward.

References

1949 births
Living people
German footballers
Association football forwards
SC Jülich players
1. FC Köln players
Bayer 04 Leverkusen players
VfL Osnabrück players
Bundesliga players
2. Bundesliga players
German football managers
VfL Osnabrück managers
People from Düren
Sportspeople from Cologne (region)
Footballers from North Rhine-Westphalia
FC Eintracht Rheine players